Thomas G. Cupillari Observatory  is an astronomical observatory in Fleetville, Pennsylvania, owned and operated by Keystone College.

It is named after Thomas G. Cupillari, a professor of physics, mathematics, and astronomy at Keystone College, who founded it in 1973 after purchasing its dome and telescope from television personality Dave Garroway. Cupillari retired as a professor in 2007, stepped down as director of the observatory in 2015, and died of cancer in 2021.

See also
 List of astronomical observatories

References

External links
 Cupillari Observatory Clear Sky Clock Forecasts of observing conditions.

Astronomical observatories in Pennsylvania